The Woljeon Museum is a museum in Gwango-dong, Icheon, Gyeonggi-do, South Korea.

External links
Official site

See also
List of museums in South Korea

Art museums and galleries in South Korea
Museums in Gyeonggi Province
Biographical museums in South Korea